Our Hero is a Canadian teen comedy-drama television series. It ran for 26 episodes over two seasons on CBC and WTN from October 5, 2000, until January 20, 2002, and was syndicated in the United States on WAM! and in the United Kingdom on Channel 5.

Premise  
The series resolves around 17-year old Canadian Kale Stiglic (Cara Pifko) who creates a zine about her life in suburban Toronto with her friends Ross Korolus (Justin Peroff), Mary-Elizabeth Penrose (Jeanie Calleja), and Dalal Vidya (Vik Sahay). Each episode was named after an "issue" of her zine. Similar to Disney's Lizzie McGuire, plot segments were interspersed with quirky animated sequences narrated by Kale, with the animation reflecting the illustrations used in that issue's zine.

Cast 
 Cara Pifko as Kale Stiglic, the protagonist who writes a zine about her life.
 Jeanie Calleja as Mary Elizabeth Penrose, Kale's best friend since childhood and Dalal's girlfriend. She lives in a strict Catholic family.
 Justin Peroff as Ross Korolus, Kale's friend, who discovers he is gay during the course of the series. He is of Ukrainian descent.
 Michael George as Ethan Stiglic, Kale's older brother and an aspiring comedian.
 Vik Sahay as Dalal Vidya, Mary E's boyfriend and Kale and Ross's friend.
 Christopher Ralph as Malachi, an environmentalist and zine writer who dates Kale in season 2.
 Jesse Nilsson as Rollins, who Kale has a crush on.
 Robert Bockstael as Joey Stiglic, Kale and Ethan's father.
 Mimi Kuzyk as Mila Stiglic, Kale and Ethan's mother.
 Daniel Enright as Bill Fisher, who works at the photocopying shop Kale uses to print copies of her zine. He dates Kale for a few episodes.
 Tory Cassis as Gordon, Kale's friend who uses a wheelchair after having cancer. He dies in "The Last Laugh Issue".
 Erin Hickock as Shana, a teen mother who works at the health food store with Kale briefly.

Episodes

Season 1 (2000–01)

Season 2 (2001–02)

Production 
Our Hero was created by John May and Suzanne Bolch who also had writing credits on all but two episodes. May also directed a number of episodes. Along with Karen Lee Hall the three formed Heroic Film Company, a Toronto production company that is mainly focused on creating youth oriented television programming.

The series was filmed in the Canadian Broadcasting Centre at Front St and John St in Toronto, Ontario. To save time and money, there were always two episodes shot at once.

Some still and Super 8 photography for the zine sequences was shot with a very small crew along the city's streets.

Awards

Wins 
 2003 – Writers Guild of Canada Award for Writing ("The Karma Issue")
 2002 – Writers Guild of Canada Award for Writing ("The Unresolved Issue")
 2001 – Writers Guild of Canada Award for Writing ("The Shallow Issue")

Nominations 
 2002 – Canadian Comedy Award – Pretty Funny Female Performance for Jeanie Calleja
 2002 – Canadian Comedy Award – Pretty Funny Male Performance for Vik Sahay
 2002 – Canadian Comedy Award – Pretty Funny Writing for TV Series for Suzanne Bolch & John May
 2002 – Gemini Awards – Best Children's or Youth Fiction Program or Series
 2002 – Gemini Awards – Best Writing in a Children's or Youth Program and Series
 2001 – Gemini Awards – Best Original Music Score for a Dramatic Series

External links 

Heroic Film Company official site

CBC Television original programming
2000 Canadian television series debuts
2002 Canadian television series endings
2000s Canadian teen drama television series
Television shows set in Toronto
Television shows filmed in Toronto
Television series about teenagers
Television series by DHX Media
Television shows about comics
Canadian television series with live action and animation